Walter Stratton (died c. 1444) was the member of Parliament for the constituency of Dover for multiple parliaments from November 1414 to 1427.

References 

Members of the Parliament of England for Dover
English MPs November 1414
English MPs 1419
English MPs December 1421
English MPs 1423
English MPs 1427